Center Township is one of eleven townships in Benton County, Indiana. As of the 2020 census, its population was 2,715 and it contained 1,212 housing units. It was organized in June 1875 and was originally known as Prairie Township.

Geography

Cities and towns
 Fowler (the county seat)

Unincorporated towns
 Atkinson
 Barce
 Gravel Hill
 Swanington
(This list is based on USGS data and may include former settlements.)

Adjacent townships
 Bolivar (southeast)
 Gilboa (northeast)
 Grant (southwest)
 Oak Grove (south)
 Parish Grove (west)
 Pine (east)
 Richland (northwest)
 Union (north)

Major highways
  U.S. Route 41
  U.S. Route 52
  State Road 18
  State Road 55

Education
 Benton Community School Corporation

References

Citations

Sources
 
 United States Census Bureau cartographic boundary files

External links

 Indiana Township Association
 United Township Association of Indiana

Townships in Benton County, Indiana
Lafayette metropolitan area, Indiana
Townships in Indiana